The Battle of Labrytae was a battle around 380 BC that occurred nearly directly after Octamasades usurped the Sindian throne from his father Hecataeus and attacked and took the city of Labrytae, presumably a city under Bosporan rule. Leukon, the ruler of the Bosporan Kingdom, had made war upon Oktamasades on behalf of Hekataios, who was a vassal of the Bosporans prior to his removal from the throne.

Prelude
Hecataeus had suffered a war against his former wife Tirgatao after marrying the wife of Satyrus I and imprisoning Tirgatao to a tower. Tirgatao had escaped and rallied her tribe of Ixomatae and laid fire and sword to both the lands of Hekataios and those of Satyros. This made the two sought peace, Tirgatao giving it to them after negotiations. Metrodorus, a son of Satyrus was sent as a hostage. Satyrus then attempted to assassinate Tirgatao, but this failed and he lost his son Metrodorus in the process. Peace was made when Gorgippus, one Satyrus's sons, became a co-regent with Leucon. Oktamasades may have been a son of Tirgitao, and therefore usurped the throne from his father presumably shortly after the war had ended with his mother and her tribe. His rebellion must've required some sort of backing from at least part of the aristocracy in the Sindike Kingdom.

Battle
Octamasades had taken the city before the battle, prompting Leucon to involve himself due to an attack on a Bosporan city. Leucon likely saw this as an opportunity to add the Sindike Kingdom to his possessions, and waged war. Leucon, before the battle, had made a vow to erect a monument not to the Apollo the Labryeans worshipped, but Apollo, the god the Spartocids worshipped the most. Upon battling Octamasades, Leucon quickly routed his army, and forced him to flee to Scythia, leaving behind the throne for his father to re-take.

Aftermath
Leucon upon gaining victory, made good on his vow and erected a statue to Phoebus Apollo at Labrytae. It is unknown whether Hekataios renounced his power to Leukon, or died while Leukon fought Oktamasades. The Sindice Kingdom had been made a province of the Bosporan Kingdom shortly after the battle, suggesting that Leucon became ruler of the land shortly after gaining victory.

References

Wars of the Bosporan Kingdom
380 Conflicts